Petter Ravn (4 October 1908 – 17 September 1985) was a Norwegian footballer. He played in one match for the Norway national football team in 1931.

References

External links
 

1908 births
1985 deaths
Norwegian footballers
Norway international footballers
Place of birth missing
Association footballers not categorized by position